Durfulija is a village in the municipality of Lozovo, North Macedonia.

Demographics
According to the 2002 census, the village had a total of 756 inhabitants. Ethnic groups in the village include:

Macedonians 569
Turks 118
Serbs 18
Aromanians 49
Others 2

References

Villages in Lozovo Municipality